Castle Falls is a 2021 American action film starring and directed by Dolph Lundgren in his first film as director since 2010, who produced with Andre Relis and Craig Baumgarten. The film co-stars Scott Adkins, Jim Chandler, Kim Delonghi, Dave Halls, Scott Hunter, Robert Berlin and Lundgren's real life daughter Ida Lundgren.

Plot
After decades of neglect, Castle Heights Hospital, this symbol of the city's segregated past has been packed with dynamite and it is ready to be demolished. No one knows that a gang leader (Berlin) now in prison, hid the 3 million dollars in cash he stole from his rivals inside the abandoned building. Now, three desperate parties want the money - a blue collared ex-fighter (Adkins) who finds it while working as part of the demolition crew, a prison guard (Lundgren) willing to do anything to pay for his daughter's cancer treatment and a ruthless gang who claim to be the rightful owners. The demolition charges are set, everyone clears out and the Castle is set to fall in 90 minutes. The three parties all try to find the cash and get out alive.

Cast

 Dolph Lundgren as Richard Ericson
 Scott Adkins as Mike Wade
 Jim Chandler as Foreman
 Kim Delonghi as Kat
 Dave Halls as Vince
 Kevin Wayne as James
 Scott Hunter as Deacon Glass
 Luke Hawx as Inmate #2
 Billy Culbertson as Inmate / Busted Lip
 Leslie Sides as Mayor's Assistant
 Melanie Jeffcoat as Doctor
 Ida Lundgren as Emily
 Evan Elise Owens as Cop
 Justin B. Wooten as Duke
 Bill Billions as Walsh
 Evan Dane Taylor as Fighter
 Eric Gray as Lando
 Meagan Bown as News Reporter
 Robert Berlin as Damian Glass
 Vas Sanchez as George
 Alicia Roye as George's Wife
 Meg Deusner as Social Worker
 Nathan Harris as Construction worker
 Ethan Melisano as MMA Fighter
 Samuel Puccio as MMA Coach
 A. Todd Baker as Mayor Lloyd Holmes
 Hassel Kromer as Construction worker
 Edward Hall as Security Guard
 Bruce Cooper as Mayor's Security
 Kourtney Harper
 Derrick Goodman Jr. as Prisoner

Release

Theatrical
The film has a limited release in the United States on December 3, 2021.

Home media
It will be available in Blu-ray and video on demand on December 28, 2021.

Reception

Critical response

References

External links
 

2021 films
2021 action thriller films
2020s American films
2020s English-language films
2020s prison films
American films about revenge
American action thriller films
American prison films
Films about orphans
Films directed by Dolph Lundgren
Films set in Alabama
Films set in hospitals